Sir Anthony Russell Brenton,  (born 1 January 1950) is a former British diplomat.

Education
Brenton was educated at Peter Symonds' School, a former direct grant grammar school for boys (which subsequently became Peter Symonds College) in the city of Winchester in Hampshire, followed by Queens' College at the University of Cambridge, where he studied Mathematics.

Life and career
Brenton entered the British Foreign and Commonwealth Office in 1975, where he began his career learning Arabic and spent three years in the British Embassy in Cairo working on Middle East disputes. He later worked in London and Brussels on the development of European Community Foreign and Energy Policy and, also in Brussels, he worked on European Environment Policy for the European Commission, dealing with energy issues, the Chernobyl crisis and the birth of European environment policy.

Brenton took a sabbatical at Harvard University to write The Greening of Machiavelli – The History of International Environmental Politics after setting up and leading (1990–92) the Foreign Office unit that negotiated for the 1992 Rio "Earth Summit", and in particular the first global agreement on climate change. In 1989–90, he headed a UN Department in the Foreign Office in London. Through 1994–98 he worked as a Counsellor in British Embassy in Moscow, responsible for the British aid programme to Russia, analysis of the Russian economy and UK policy towards Russia in the major international economic fields. In 1998 he was nominated to the position of Director on Global Issues in FCO. Within the sphere of his responsibilities was the policy towards the UN, human rights, the environment and international economy and development.

Brenton served as British Ambassador to Russia from 2004–2008. In 2007, he was made a Knight Commander of the Order of St Michael and St George (KCMG), thereby gaining the title Sir. From 2008–2017, he was a fellow of Wolfson College, Cambridge.

Selected works
 Tony Brenton (2016) Historically Inevitable? Turning Points of the Russian Revolution

References

Sources
 Sir Anthony Russell Brenton, KCMG from British Embassy, Moscow. Retrieved 15 January 2008.

External links
 It is time to back away from the Russian Wolf by Tony Brenton

1950 births
Living people
Alumni of Queens' College, Cambridge
Ambassadors of the United Kingdom to Russia
Fellows of Wolfson College, Cambridge
Place of birth missing (living people)
Knights Commander of the Order of St Michael and St George